Making Things with Light is the third album by the Berkeley, California punk rock band The Mr. T Experience, released in 1990 by Lookout! Records. It was the band's first album to include bass player Aaron Rubin, replacing former bassist Byron Stomatos. The album's title refers to its cover art, which shows the four band members depicted using a Lite-Brite toy.

The album was compiled from several recording sessions the band had conducted over a two-year period, including a demo tape they had recorded in October 1989 and a studio session in June 1990. The CD version of the album includes numerous bonus tracks from three live performances, as well as a cover of the Shonen Knife song "Flying Jelly Attack" that had originally been released on the compilation Every Band Has a Shonen Knife Who Loves Them.

Track listing

Performers
Dr. Frank - vocals, guitar
Jon Von Zelowitz - vocals, guitar
Aaron Rubin - bass
Alex Laipeneiks - drums

Album information
Record label: Lookout! Records
Tracks 1, 4, 5, 9, 11, and 13 from an October 1989 demo tape
Tracks 2, 3, 6-8, 10, and 12 recorded in June 1990
Tracks 14, 15, and 17-21 recorded live at 924 Gilman Street on December 8, 1989
Track 16 recorded live during a broadcast on 91.3 FM KTEQ at the South Dakota School of Mines and Technology (engineered by Bob Wally)
Track 21 recorded live at Club Soda in Vancouver, British Columbia, Canada in August 1989
Track 22 recorded November 1989 (engineered by Kevin Army)
Produced by Kevin Army and executive produced by Lawrence Livermore
Recorded at Sound and Vision studio in San Francisco, California
Mixed at Dancing Dog
Mastered by John Golden at K-Disc in Hollywood, California
Cover art by Mitchelle Crisp
Disc artwork by Dzuris
Band photos by Josh Rubin and Dan Cook
Collage artwork by Aaron Rubin
Art direction by Jon Von Zelowitz

The Mr. T Experience albums
1990 albums